Kevin Thompson is an American politician and member of the Arizona Corporation Commission. Before being elected to the Commission in 2022, Thompson served on the Mesa City Council. He is a member of the Republican Party.

Personal life and education 
Thompson was born in West Monroe, Louisiana, but grew up in Dallas, Texas..

At age 19, Thompson joined the United States Air Force. After completing his basic training, he married his wife, Donna. Thompson would go on to spend eight years in the service before being honorably discharged in 1996, serving in many missions, including Operation Desert Storm.

After his service, Thompson went on to complete a B.S. in Mechanical Engineering from the University of Nevada, Las Vegas (UNLV).

In 1998, he went on to work for Southwest Gas. Thompson later filed a lawsuit against the company after being terminated in 2015 and subsequently settled out of court.

Thompson is the principal owner of his consulting firm, Broadmore Consulting. He and his wife Donna have two children.

Political career 
Thompson has served on the Mesa City Council, representing District 6, since 2015. In 2018, he was re-elected to the council, having been unopposed in the general election.

Thompson announced that he was running for a seat on the Arizona Corporation Commission in 2022. Thompson and fellow Republican Nick Myers went on to win the general election in November.

Electoral history

References 

 

Arizona politicians
Arizona Republicans
Living people
University of Nevada, Las Vegas alumni
Year of birth missing (living people)